The 2000 National League Division Series (NLDS), the opening round of the 2000 National League playoffs, began on Tuesday, October 3, and ended on Sunday, October 8, with the champions of the three NL divisions—along with a "wild card" team—participating in two best-of-five series. They were:

(1) San Francisco Giants (Western Division champions, 97–65) vs. (4) New York Mets (Wild Card, 94–68): Mets win series, 3–1.
(2) St. Louis Cardinals (Central Division champions, 95–67) vs. (3) Atlanta Braves (Eastern Division champions, 95–67): Cardinals win series, 3–0.

The Cardinals and Mets went on to meet in the NL Championship Series (NLCS). The Mets beat the Cardinals four games to one to advance to the 2000 World Series, where they would lose to the American League champion New York Yankees in five games.

Matchups

San Francisco Giants vs. New York Mets

St. Louis Cardinals vs. Atlanta Braves

San Francisco vs. New York

Game 1
Pacific Bell Park in San Francisco

In the first ever playoff game at Pacific Bell Park, the Giants struck first in the bottom of the first when Jeff Kent followed a double and single with an RBI groundout off Mike Hampton. Giants Pitcher Liván Hernández allowed one run and five hits (on a walk in the third that tied the game) over a  inning effort. In the bottom of the third, Bill Mueller singled with two outs and scored on Barry Bonds's triple to put the Giants back in front. After a walk, a three-run home run by Ellis Burks capped the scoring at 5–1 as the Giants took a 1–0 series lead.

Game 2
Pacific Bell Park in San Francisco

In Game 2, the Mets loaded the bases on a hit-by-pitch and two walks off Shawn Estes when Timo Perez's two-run single put them up 2–0. The Giants cut it to 2–1 in the bottom of the inning when Jeff Kent hit a leadoff single and scored on Ellis Burks's double. Behind strong pitching from Al Leiter and a two-out two-run home run from Edgardo Alfonzo in the top of the ninth inning off Félix Rodríguez, the Mets carried a 4–1 lead into the last of the ninth. However, following a double by Barry Bonds and a single from Jeff Kent, pinch hitter J. T. Snow hit a towering three-run home run off Mets reliever Armando Benítez to tie the game at four. The Mets would bounce back in the tenth inning, with Rookie Jay Payton singling home Darryl Hamilton, who doubled with two outs, off Rodriguez. The Giants would threaten again, and had the tying run on with two out and Bonds at the plate, but John Franco struck out Bonds looking on a wicked 3–2 changeup, giving the Mets a heart-stopping 5–4 victory and a 1–1 series moving to New York.

Game 3
Shea Stadium in Queens, New York

The series shifted to Shea Stadium with game 3 starting at 4:20 P.M. (Eastern time), Giants starting pitcher Russ Ortiz stifled the Mets early, and had a no-hitter entering the sixth inning. He was staked to a 2–0 lead thanks to two leadoff singles in the fourth off Rick Reed, followed RBI singles from Bobby Estalella and Marvin Benard. In the sixth, the Mets broke through. After a walk and single, rookie Timo Pérez, forced into action due to a Game 1 injury to starting right fielder Derek Bell, blooped a single over third base to score Mike Bordick and put the Mets on the scoreboard.

Two innings later, with the Mets still down by one run, pinch hitter Lenny Harris barely beat out the return throw on what would have been an inning-ending double play off Doug Henry. The Giants brought in closer Robb Nen, who had not blown a save since July to face Edgardo Alfonzo. However, Alfonzo ended that streak by ripping a double into the left field corner to score Harris and tie the game.

The game continued on into extra innings, where both teams mounted scoring threats, only to be turned away each time.

The game ended when Benny Agbayani blasted a home run into the left field bleachers with one out in the thirteenth inning off Aaron Fultz, capping another memorable postseason game at Shea Stadium and putting the Mets ahead in the series two games to one. Game three nail-biter lasted 5 hours and 22 minutes, it was the second longest playoff game by hours and minutes in Major League Baseball history at the time.

Game 4
Shea Stadium in Queens, New York

In perhaps the most unlikely great pitching performance in recent memory, Bobby Jones, the Mets' fourth starter, completely shut down the Giants offense, hurling a masterful one-hit shutout to clinch the series for the Mets. Mixing 85 MPH fastballs and 65 MPH curveballs, Jones thoroughly baffled Giant hitters all afternoon, setting down the side in order in eight of nine innings. Jeff Kent's leadoff double in the fifth inning would be the Giants' only hit. Jones would get all the offense he would need on Robin Ventura's two-run home run in the first inning off Mark Gardner. The Mets padded their lead in the fifth on Edgardo Alfonso's two-run double. Jones got Barry Bonds to fly out to center to end the game, and set off a raucous celebration at Shea Stadium.

Mets announcer Bob Murphy would say following the final out, 

The one-hitter set a Mets' record for fewest hits allowed in a post-season complete game, besting Jon Matlack's two-hitter in the 1973 NLCS. It was also the fewest hits allowed in a League Division Series complete game until Roy Halladay's no-hitter in 2010.

Composite box
2000 NLDS (3–1): New York Mets over San Francisco Giants

St. Louis vs. Atlanta

Game 1
Busch Stadium (II) in St. Louis, Missouri

It was a poorly pitched game for both starters, both of whom would last four innings or less. Greg Maddux faced Rick Ankiel. In the bottom of the first, Maddux allowed four straight hits to lead off the inning, the last two of which scored a run each. An error on Ray Lankford's ground ball allowed another run to score, then after a sacrifice bunt and intentional, Plácido Polanco's single aided by another error cleared the bases, making it 6–0 Cardinals. But the Braves would make a game of it in the top of the third when Ankiel's control slipped away. He walked Maddux and Andruw Jones, then threw four wild pitches to put them on second and third. Ankiel then threw another wild pitch on a ball four to Andrés Galarraga, walking him and letting Maddux score. Brian Jordan then hit an RBI single and after another wild pitch and walk loaded the bases, Walt Weiss's two-run single cut the Cardinals' lead to 6–4. Jim Edmonds's fourth-inning home run make it 7–4. After the fourth, Maddux was done. In the top of the ninth, an error and walk put runners on first and second off Dave Veres before Jordan's RBI single cut the Cardinals' lead to 7–5 and put the tying runs on, but Veres retired the next two batters to end the game. Mike James would get the win in relief of Ankiel.

Game 2
Busch Stadium (II) in St. Louis, Missouri

Tom Glavine of the Braves faced Darryl Kile of the Cardinals. In the top of the first, Rafael Furcal drew a leadoff walk, moved second on a groundout, and scored on Chipper Jones's single. After a double, Brian Jordan's RBI groundout made it 2–0 Braves, but Will Clark hit a three-run homer in the bottom half to put the Cards up for good. Carlos Hernández homered in the second, then in the third, the Cardinals loaded the bases on a single, double and hit-by-pitch before Eric Davis's sacrifice fly scored a run, then Ray Lankford's two-run double gave the Cardinals a commanding 7–2 lead. Glavine was finished and the Braves changed pitchers five times. Next inning, Édgar Rentería walked, stole second and scored on Jim Edmonds's double off Andy Ashby. John Burkett hit Fernando Viña with a pitch leading off the sixth, then Edmonds's one-out RBI double made it 9–2 Cardinals. In the eighth, Andruw Jones hit a one-out home run off Mike Timlin, then after Jones doubled, Jordan's RBI double made it 9–4 Cardinals, who got a run in the bottom half on Mark McGwire's home run off Mike Remlinger. Matt Morris pitched a scoreless ninth to give the Cardinals a 2–0 series lead.

Game 3
Turner Field in Atlanta

The Cardinals sent Garrett Stephenson to the mound to finish off the Braves. The Braves' last hope was Kevin Millwood, who pitched a one-hitter in the playoffs the year before. Fernando Viña's leadoff home run in the first put the Cardinals up. In the bottom half, Rafael Furcal drew a leadoff walk, stole second, move to third on a groundout and scored on Andrés Galarraga's single to tie the game, but the Braves did not score again. Jim Edmonds's two-run homer into the Atlanta bullpen in the third put the Cards in front for good. Stephenson left the game in the fourth due to tendinitis. In the fifth, Édgar Rentería walked with two outs, stole second, moved to third on a balk and scored on Edmonds' ground-rule double to knock Millwood out of the game. In the sixth, Terry Mulholland allowed a leadoff walk, single and sacrifice bunt, Plácido Polanco's fielder's choice off Kerry Ligtenberg scored a run. Polanco stole second before Vina's two-run single off Mike Remlinger capped the scoring at 7–1 Cardinals. Britt Reames won the game in relief as both teams would change pitchers four times. Paul Bako struck out against Dave Veres to end the series. The Cardinals' win in Game 3 put the Braves out of the NLCS for the first time since 1990.

Composite box
2000 NLDS (3–0): St. Louis Cardinals over Atlanta Braves

References

External links
NYM vs. SFG at Baseball-Reference
STL vs. ATL at Baseball-Reference

National League Division Series
National League Division Series
New York Mets postseason
St. Louis Cardinals postseason
San Francisco Giants postseason
Atlanta Braves postseason
National League Division Series
National League Division Series
National League Division Series
National League Division Series
National League Division Series
National League Division Series
2000s in St. Louis
National League Division Series
2000s in Queens